Polydoro (before 1929: Μάζι - Mazi) is a village in the municipal unit of Molossoi, Ioannina regional unit, Greece. In 2011 its population was 63. It is situated on a hillside on the left bank of the river Tyria. It is 4 km southwest of Voutsaras, 4 km northwest of Granitsa and 25 km west of Ioannina. The village church is dedicated to the Dormition of the Virgin.

Population

See also

List of settlements in the Ioannina regional unit

External links
polydoro.gr 
Polydoro at the GTP Travel Pages

References

Populated places in Ioannina (regional unit)